Puno is a province in the Puno Region, in southeastern Peru. It borders the provinces of Huancane, San Román, El Collao and the Moquegua Region's province of General Sánchez Cerro. Its capital is the city of Puno, which is located at the edge of Lake Titicaca, the world's highest navigable lake. It is the economic powerhouse of the region.

Geography 
Some of the highest mountains of the province are listed below:

Political division
The province is divided into fifteen districts (Spanish: distritos, singular: distrito):
 Acora
 Amantani 
 Atuncolla
 Capachica
 Chucuito
 Coata
 Huata
 Mañazo
 Paucarcolla
 Pichacani
 Plateria
 Puno
 San Antonio
 Tiquillaca
 Vilque

Ethnic groups 
The province is inhabited by indigenous citizens of Aymara and Quechua descent. Spanish is the language which the majority of the population (45.40%) learnt to speak in childhood, 27.67% of the residents started speaking using the Quechua language and 26.50% using Aymara (2007 Peru Census).

See also 
 Amantani
 Esteves (island)
 Hatunqucha
 Inka Tunuwiri
 Inka Uyu
 Jaravi
 Mayqu Amaya
 Q'axilu
 Q'inq'u
 Taquile Island
 Tikunata
 Uros

Sources 

Provinces of the Puno Region